Justin Moore is a singer-songwriter.

Justin Moore may also refer to:

Justin Moore (album)
Justin Moore (soccer) (born 1983), American soccer player 
Justin Moore (basketball) (born 2000), American basketball player
Justin P. Moore (1841–1923), American mycologist
Justin T. Moore (born 1974), set theorist and logician

Moore, Justin